Sarah Smith may refer to:

In people
Saarah Smith (born 1999), South African cricketer
Sarah Stone (artist) (1760–1844), later Sarah Smith, English natural history illustrator and painter
Sarah Bartley (1783–1850), British actress who used the name Smith
Sarah Jones (née Smith), former saxophonist in Cardiacs
Sarah Smith, member of British pop duo Same Difference
Sarah Smith (children's writer) (1832–1911), English children's writer whose nom de plume was Hesba Stretton
Sarah Smith (news reporter) (born 1968), Scottish radio and television journalist with the BBC
Sarah Smith (director), director of animated feature films Arthur Christmas and Ron's Gone Wrong
Sarah Smith (writer) (born 1947), American novelist of historical mysteries

Sarah Adina Smith, American writer, editor, and director
Sarah Bixby Smith (1871–1935), American writer
Sarah Christine Smith, American actress
Sarah Lanman Smith (1802–1836), American Christian missionary, memoirist, school founder

In fiction
Sarah Jane Smith, character from the television series Doctor Who and the spin-off series The Sarah Jane Adventures
Sarah Jane Smith (audio drama series)